Simon Acland (born 27 March 1958) is a British venture capitalist and author.

Education
Simon Hugh Verdon Acland was educated at Eton and Lincoln College, Oxford, graduating in 1979 with an Honours Degree in Modern Languages (French and German).

Career

Venture capitalism
He spent most of his venture capital career at London-based Quester. He specialised in backing early-stage technology businesses. Two of these, Surfcontrol plc and Orchestream plc, became members of the FTSE 250. Quester was acquired in 2007 by Spark Ventures.

Acland is a director of a number of companies, including AIM-listed Elektron Technology plc and two Venture Capital Trusts managed by Triple Point Investment Management, TP70 2008 (I) plc and TP70 2010 plc. He is a Trustee of the wild flora conservation charity Plantlife.

Writing
In June 2010 Acland's first novel, The Waste Land, was published by Charlwood Books. A sequel, The Flowers of Evil, followed in July 2011. These are historical novels set in the First Crusade which draw for their material on some of the myths and legends about the Holy Grail, the Assassins, and the Templars.

In October 2010 Nicholas Brealey Publishing published Acland's Angels, Dragons and Vultures : How to tame your investors...and not lose your company, a guide for entrepreneurs to raising finance and managing investors based on his experience of the venture capital world.

Political career
Acland was elected as a member of the London Borough of Lambeth in 1982 for Princes Ward in Kennington. He became Leader of the SDP/Liberal Alliance Group on Lambeth Council in 1984 and was re-elected to the Council for a second four-year term in 1986. In June 1987 he stood unsuccessfully for Parliament in the Vauxhall Constituency.

Personal life
Acland's father was Sir Antony Acland KG, GCMG, GCVO, Head of the Diplomatic Service between 1982 and 1986, and then British Ambassador in Washington till 1991. Simon Acland is married to Jo Valentine, Baroness Valentine, a cross-bench peer, and former Chief Executive of "London First".

References

External links
 
 plantlife.org.uk
 elektron-technology.com
 nicholasbrealey.com
 

1958 births
Living people
Simon
People educated at Eton College
British male writers
British venture capitalists
Spouses of life peers
Liberal Party (UK) councillors